Adolphe Tohoua (born December 9, 1983) is an Ivorian footballer who plays as a midfielder for UCE de Liège. He previously played in the Belgian Jupiler League.

Career
Tohoua started his career at homeland club Rio Sport d'Anyama, playing alongside Ivory Coast international, and World Cup 2006 player Arouna Koné. The pair became good friends, and in 2002, Tohoua, along with Koné, moved to Belgium to play for Lierse SK. While Koné moved on to Dutch side Roda JC at the end of the 2002-03 season, Tohoua stayed at Lierse until the end of the 2005-06 campaign, before moving to Excelsior Mouscron. In 2008, he left Mouscron after two years and joined league rival FC Brussels. In July 2010, he moved to lower league club KSK Hasselt.

International
Tohoua and Koné also played alongside each other in the 2003 FIFA World Youth Championship, held in the United Arab Emirates.

References

External links
FIFA Stats
footgoal profile

1983 births
Living people
Ivorian footballers
Ivory Coast under-20 international footballers
Belgian Pro League players
Challenger Pro League players
Lierse S.K. players
Royal Excel Mouscron players
R.W.D.M. Brussels F.C. players
Expatriate footballers in Belgium
Ivorian expatriate footballers
Footballers from Abidjan
Association football midfielders